Sir Stewart Bruce, 1st Baronet (died 19 Mar 1841) was a British politician.

Bruce represented Lisburn in the Irish House of Commons between 1798 and 1800. He was subsequently genealogist of the Order of St Patrick and Gentleman Usher of Dublin Castle. On 23 December 1812 he was created a baronet, of Dublin in the Baronetage of the United Kingdom. The title became extinct on his death in 1841. His brother was the Anglican priest, Henry Bruce, who was also made a baronet.

References

Year of birth unknown
1841 deaths
Baronets in the Baronetage of the United Kingdom
Stewart
Irish MPs 1798–1800